Three ships of the Royal New Zealand Navy have been named HMNZS Hawea:
 , was a frigate, 1948–1965

Royal New Zealand Navy ship names